Michael Lindsay  (1963–2019) was an American voice actor.

Michael Lindsay may also refer to:
D. Michael Lindsay (born 1971), sociologist
Michael Lindsay-Hogg (born 1940), American director
Michael Lindsay, 2nd Baron Lindsay of Birker (1909–1994), British peer and academic
 a pseudonym used by historian and hoaxer A. D. Harvey

See also
Michael Lindsey (born 1987), American football player